The 1948–49 League of Ireland was the 28th season of senior football in the Republic of Ireland.

Drumcondra were the defending champions.

Changes from 1947–48 
Two new teams were elected to the League: Sligo Rovers returned after an eight–year absence, while Transport made their début. This resulted in an expansion in size for the first time in six seasons, from eight to ten.

For the first time in the history of the League, there were more teams from outside Dublin (six) than from Dublin (four).

Teams

Season overview
Cork United resigned from the League on 10 October 1948 and disbanded following their participation in the Dublin City Cup. Cork Athletic were founded with a new board and elected in their place.

Drumcondra successfully defended their title.

Table

Results

Top goalscorers

See also 

 1948–49 FAI Cup
 1948–49 Dublin City Cup
 1948–49 League of Ireland Shield

References 

Ireland
Lea
League of Ireland seasons